WOUX is a Catholic Religious formatted broadcast radio station licensed to St. Marys, West Virginia, serving Parkersburg and Harrisville in West Virginia and Marietta in Ohio.  WOUX is owned and operated by Parkersburg Catholic Schools Foundation, Inc.

References

External links
 

2014 establishments in West Virginia
Catholic radio stations
Radio stations established in 2014
OUX
Pleasants County, West Virginia
Catholic Church in West Virginia